The IPT-5 Jaraguá, was a Brazilian sailplane aircraft designed with two seats in a tandem-seat configuration for general flying.

Design and development
Due to the war, all aircraft designers focused on new developments to achieve better performance for fighter aircraft, including the Instituto de Pesquisas Tecnologicas from 1940. The institute's chief engineer, Romeu Corsini, worked with Clay Presgrave do Amaral, a glider design specialist, to develop an experimental sailplane that had a novel wing profile. By mid-1941, work on it had been completed and the first flight took place. From 1941, the aircraft was used for numerous tests over the next ten years.

The IPT-5 had a circular fuselage with a largely glazed aerodynamic nose containing the enclosed cockpit with two side-by-side seats. The aircraft was of wooden construction and was partly covered with paraná pine and partly with varnished linho. The IPT-5 was larger than any glider built in Brazil up to that time. The aircraft was designed as a mid-wing monoplane with a conventional tailplane and had a single wheel under the fuselage.

Specifications

See also

 List of gliders

References

External links
IPT’s official site

1940s Brazilian experimental aircraft
Aircraft first flown in 1941
Glider aircraft
Mid-wing aircraft